Ulrich Pinkall (born 1955) is a German mathematician, specializing in differential geometry and computer graphics.

Pinkall studied mathematics at the University of Freiburg with a Diplom in 1979 and a doctorate in 1982 with thesis Dupin'sche Hyperflächen (Dupin's hypersurfaces) under the supervision of Martin Barner. Pinkall was then a research assistant in Freiburg until 1984 and from 1984 to 1986 at the Max Planck Institute for Mathematics in Bonn. In 1985 he completed his habilitation in Bonn with thesis Totale Absolutkrümmung immersierter Flächen (Total absolute curvature of immersed surfaces). Since 1986 he is professor at TU Berlin.

In 1985 he received the Otto Hahn Medal of the Max Planck Society. In 1986 he received a Heisenberg-Stipendium from the Deutsche Forschungsgemeinschaft (DFG). From 1992 to 2003 he was a speaker of the Sonderforschungsbereich (SFB) 288 (differential geometry and quantum physics).

In 1998 he was an Invited Speaker with talk Quaternionic analysis of Riemann surfaces and differential geometry at the International Congress of Mathematicians in Berlin.

Selected publications
 
 
 
 
  1988
 
 
 
 
 
 
 
  arXiv preprint

References

External links
 
 

1955 births
Living people
20th-century German mathematicians
21st-century German mathematicians
Differential geometers
University of Freiburg alumni
Academic staff of the Technical University of Berlin